The Violin Concerto is a concerto for violin and orchestra in three movements by the American composer Elliott Carter.  The work was jointly commissioned by the San Francisco Symphony and the violinist Ole Bøhn.  It was completed February 26, 1990 in Waccabuc, New York, and was premiered May 2, 1990 in San Francisco, with conductor Herbert Blomstedt leading Bøhn and the San Francisco Symphony.  The piece won the 1994 Grammy Award for Best Classical Contemporary Composition.

Composition

Structure
The Violin Concerto has a duration of roughly 26 minutes and is composed in three continuous movements:
Impulsivo
Angosciato - Tranquillo
Scherzando

Instrumentation
The work is scored for solo violin and an orchestra consisting of piccolo, two flutes (2nd doubling piccolo), two oboes, cor anglais, two clarinets (2nd doubling E-flat clarinet and bass clarinet), bass clarinet, two bassoons, contrabassoon, four horns, three trumpets, three trombones, tuba, two percussionists, and strings.

Reception
Reviewing the New York City premiere, Bernard Holland of The New York Times recommended the Violin Concerto, writing:
John von Rhein of the Chicago Tribune also praised the work, commenting, "Those listeners who normally find Carter's music abrasive should be pleased to discover how lyrical and flowing this music is. Its complexities compel, rather than repel, attention."  Andrew Clements of The Guardian lauded the form and orchestration of the piece, writing:

References

Concertos by Elliott Carter
1990 compositions
Carter
20th-century classical music
Music commissioned by the San Francisco Symphony